Yvette M. Alexander (born October 1, 1961, in the District of Columbia) is a Democratic politician in Washington, D.C. She represented Ward 7 on the Council of the District of Columbia from 2007 to 2017. After losing her council seat, Alexander started a health care consulting practice.

Education
Alexander has a Bachelor of Business Administration from Howard University, and did graduate work at Trinity College.

Political career
On May 1, 2007, Alexander won the special election to succeed her political mentor Vincent C. Gray.  Gray had represented Ward 7 before he became council chairman in January. She received 34 percent of the vote, beating 17 other candidates (14 Democrats and 4 independents).

She faced a Democratic primary for re-election on September 9, 2008. Notable opponents in that Democratic primary were John Campbell and Robin Hammond Marlin. No individuals filed to appear on the ballot for the Republican or Statehood-Green parties. Alexander won the primary and general election.

Alexander lobbied other state delegations for DC voting rights at the 2004 Democratic Convention in Boston, Massachusetts.  She was an Obama superdelegate (though formally unpledged) to the 2008 Democratic National Convention, although she had endorsed Barack Obama before Hillary Clinton conceded the race.

Political positions
Alexander was one of two DC council members to reject gay marriage when it was put to vote November 10, 2009, by the Council of the District of Columbia.

Alexander opposed DC's Death with Dignity legislation that would allow terminally ill patients to end their suffering.

Alexander was active in the campaign to have a DC-based barbershop properly replace its lighting. She insisted the responsible government agency, DCRA, use its oversight to get the business to correct the sign from "Sex Barbershop" to "Unisex Barbershop".

References

External links
Yvette Alexander (campaign website)
Councilmember Yvette M. Alexander Biography (official website)

Members of the Council of the District of Columbia
Living people
Women city councillors in the District of Columbia
Washington, D.C., Democrats
African-American people in Washington, D.C., politics
African-American women in politics
1961 births
Howard University alumni
African-American city council members
21st-century American politicians
21st-century American women politicians
21st-century African-American women
21st-century African-American politicians
20th-century African-American people
20th-century African-American women